Sandford Street is a light rail station in Australia on the Canberra Metro R1 Civic to Gungahlin line, located at the intersection of Flemington Road, Sandford Street and Morriset Road in Mitchell. The station serves the surrounding business and industrial precinct, and will support future residential development in the neighbouring suburb of Kenny.  Bicycle racks are provided around the intersection adjacent to the station. It is the only station on the Civic to Gungahlin route that did not open with stage 1 of the network.

History
A light rail stop serving the Mitchell industrial area was considered during the design and planning phase of the Capital Metro project. Public consultation on the final route suggested that relatively few commuters would use this stop on a regular basis,  given as justification by ACT Government to exclude it from construction of stage 1. The construction phase caused significant disruption to many businesses in Mitchell, who were unhappy with omission of a station at this location. Due in part to lobbying by the local business community, $4.8 million was allocated to the planning of a new station at the intersection of Sandford Street and Flemington Road in June 2019  Construction costs were estimated at $12 million, with half of this amount provided by the Federal Government to allow works to commence ahead of schedule  Construction began in December 2020 and the station opened on 16 September 2021 as the 14th stop on the Civic to Gungahlin route.

Light rail services
All services in both directions stop at the station. During peak periods, some services originating at Gungahlin Place also terminate here, as it is the closest station to the depot for south-bound light rail vehicles. There is no interchange available with ACTION bus routes.

Although the station is only a short distance from the main Canberra Metro Operations depot, light rail vehicles will sometimes also stop at a small shelter immediately south of the platform to allow for crew transfer. This is not a timetabled stop and is not accessible to the public.

References

Light rail stations in Canberra
Railway stations in Australia opened in 2021